The Unloved is an Australian television drama series which first screened on the Nine Network in 1968. It was produced by NLT Productions.

References

External links
The Unloved at AustLit

Nine Network original programming
Australian legal television series
1968 Australian television series debuts
1960s Australian drama television series
English-language television shows